This article contains the list of the past, present and forthcoming film singers that are based in Pakistan.
Following are the most popular Pakistani film singers of all times.

For more film singers by their letter specifications you can find it below.

A

Ahmed Rushdi
Atif Aslam
Alamgir Haq

F

G
 Ghulam Ali
 Gul Panra

H
 Hadiqa Kiyani
 Humera Arshad

I
 Inayat Hussain Bhatti

J
 Jawad Ahmed

L
 Laila Khan

M
 Mala
 Masood Rana
 Mehdi Hassan

N
 Naseem Begum
 Nayyara Noor
Nazia Hassan
 Noor Jehan
Nusrat Fateh Ali Khan

R
 Rahat Fateh Ali Khan

S
 Shafqat Amanat Ali
 Shoukat Ali Khan

W
 Waris Baig

Z
 Zoheb Hassan
 Zubaida Khanum

See also 
 Music of Pakistan 
 List of Pakistanis
 Music of South Asia
 Culture of Pakistan

External links 
 PakistaniMusic.com
 PakHits.com
 History on Pakistani Film music
 Information about Indo-Pakistan music

Singers 
Film Singers 
Film Singers